Nondumiso Tembe (born 15 December 1987), is a South African actress, singer, songwriter, dancer and writer. She is best known for the roles in many Hollywood television serials such as; NCIS: Los Angeles, True Blood, Castle and Six.

Personal life
Nondumiso was born on 15 December 1987 in Durban, South Africa. Her mother is Linda Bukhosini and father is Bongani Tembe, both are opera singers. She left the country during Apartheid and finally returned following the end of apartheid. She studied musical theatre at the American Musical and Dramatic Academy (AMDA). Then she graduated from the New York New School University with a bachelor's degree in Fine Arts in Theatre and later completed his master's degree in Political Science.

In April 2021, her younger cousin Anele “Nelli” Tembe fell from the 10th floor of a Cape Town hotel and died. Anele was engaged to popular rapper, AKA. After the demise, Nondumiso released a heart touching message on social media about her death.

Career
She started to act in opera and theater in USA when she was 6 years old. Then she played the titular role in the stage play Annie. The play became very popular and became the turning point of her career. With that play, she also became the first black actress to lead a multi-racial cast in a major theatrical production in post-Apartheid South Africa. Then she played the role of "Maria" in the play Leopard Skin and the role of "Thobile" in the play Mata-Mata. At the Los Angeles theatre, she performed in the play Romeo and Juliet with the role "Josephine Baker". In 2011, she made television debut with a recurring role as a "ghost Mavis" on the serial True Blood.

In December 2013, she joined with the cast of popular soap opera, Generations with the role of "Phumelele Miya". In 2015, she made a supportive role in the Hollywood blockbuster Avengers: Age of Ultron. She was awarded the Best Lead Actress at the Musical Mercury Theatre Awards for her role in the musical Cinderella created by Rodgers and Hammerstein. She also won the Best Actress in the Supporting Role category during the Naledi Theatre Awards for her role, "Susan" in David Mamet’s play.

As a singer, she made her debut album titled IZWI LAMI; My Voice, which was released in January 2011.  She joined with 90th birthday celebration of Nelson Mandela in his residence in Qunu as a featured performer.

Filmography

Film

Television

Video Games

References

External links
 IMDb

Living people
South African film actresses
South African television actresses
South African stage actresses
1987 births